Industrial Police is a specialized unit of Bangladesh Police responsible for providing security in Industrial zones of Bangladesh. Shafiqul Islam is the Present Chief of the Industrial Police.

History
In 2009, Prime Minister Sheikh Hasina announced plans for the formation of an Industrial Police in the Parliament. The Initial proposal was turned down by the Ministry of Finance which recommended strengthening local police or using Bangladesh Ansar. Industrial Police was established on 4 October 2010 to protect Industrial zones in Dhaka, Chittagong, Narayanganj, and Gazipur. The force started with 5000 personal deputed from Bangladesh Police and provided special training at the Police Staff College. The formation of the Industrial police resulted in mixed reactions with owners being optimistic while workers were more cautious.

The Industrial police is used to quell labor unrest in the garment industry of Bangladesh. The Unit is led by a Director General from Bangladesh Police. In 2015, Industrial police officer was assassinated at a police check-post in Ashulia by suspected Islamist terrorists.

Controversy
In November 2017, three police officers of the unit were arrested for abducting a pedestrian for ransom. The abductors were led by assistant sub-inspector Mokbul Hossen of the Dhaka unit.

The United has faced accusations of having too close ties with the Bangladesh Garment Manufacturers and Exporters Association. The association is reported to have donated vehicles to the unit. The workers having accused the unit of siding with garment factory owners in industrial disputes.

References

2010 establishments in Bangladesh
Bangladesh Police
Law enforcement agencies of Bangladesh